The 2015 Algerian Cup Final was the 51st final of the Algerian Cup. The final took place on May 2, 2015, at Stade Mustapha Tchaker in Blida with kick-off at 16:00.

Route to the final

Pre-match

Details

References

Cup
Algerian Cup Finals